Long Live Love may refer to:
Long Live Love, a 1923 painting by Max Ernst
Long Live Love (album), a 1974 album by Olivia Newton-John
"Long Live Love" (Olivia Newton-John song), title track from the album
"Long Live Love" (Chris Andrews song), a hit single for Sandie Shaw
"Long Live Love" (LeAnn Rimes song), a 2016 single from Remnants
Long, Live, Love, a 2019 album by Kirk Franklin